Raimund Krauth (27 December 1952 – 22 November 2012) was a German professional footballer who played as a striker.

Career
Krauth played for Eintracht Frankfurt, FK Pirmasens and Karlsruher SC.

Later life and death
Krauth died on 22 November 2012.

References

1952 births
2012 deaths
German footballers
Eintracht Frankfurt players
Karlsruher SC players
Bundesliga players
2. Bundesliga players
Footballers from Karlsruhe
Association football forwards
FK Pirmasens players
20th-century German people